Andrew B. Williams (born April 18, 1979) is a former American football defensive end for the San Francisco 49ers in the National Football League.

He briefly played for the Orlando Predators of the Arena Football League.

References 

1979 births
Living people
American football defensive ends
Hinds Eagles football players
Miami Hurricanes football players
San Francisco 49ers players
Players of American football from Tampa, Florida
Orlando Predators players